Ixodes arboricola, also called the tree-hole tick, is a species of  tick that parasitises small passerine birds. It is among the most common species on the house sparrow.

References

arboricola
Animals described in 1930
Parasites of birds
Arachnids of Asia